was a village located in Kitakoma District, Yamanashi Prefecture, Japan.

As of 2003, the village had an estimated population of 4,155 and a density of 65.88 persons per km². The total area was 63.07 km².

History 
On November 1, 2004, Ōizumi, along with the towns of Hakushū, Nagasaka, Sutama and Takane, and the villages of Akeno and Mukawa (all from Kitakoma District), was merged to create the city of Hokuto.

External links
Hokuto official website 

Dissolved municipalities of Yamanashi Prefecture
Hokuto, Yamanashi